Mecklenburg cuisine is typically northeast German. Many dishes in the region today, whilst retaining their original characteristics, frequently add new facets, whilst old dishes are being rediscovered and combined with current recipes.

Mecklenburg food has traditionally been considered as rather down-to-earth and hearty. It reflects, on the one hand, the simple life of the region of Mecklenburg, long dominated by agriculture, and on the other hand, its long Baltic coastline and the abundance of its inland waters. In addition, its vast forests produce a wealth of game. Potatoes, known locally as Tüften, play a particularly important role in the region also, as evinced by the existence of a potato museum (the Vorpommersches Kartoffelmuseum) in neighbouring West Pomerania, and a variety of cooking methods are used to prepare them. Other staples are kale, known as Grünkohl and a sweet-and-sour flavour produced, for example, by using dried fruit. Although Mecklenburg and Western Pomerania have both had long, independent histories, the similarity in living conditions and landscapes in both regions has resulted in both populations having similar eating habits.

Carl Julius Weber reported in the 18th century on the eating habits of the Mecklenburgers: .

Specialities

Fish 
Gebratener Räucheraal or Gebackener Spickaal (baked, smoked eel)
Gebratene Maischolle or Braden Maischull

Pork and beef 
Kloppschinken
Topfleberwurst
Mecklenburg roast ribs (Mecklenburger Rippenbraten)

Stews, vegetable and potato dishes 
Tüffel un Plum (potato soup with plums and bacon)
Fliederbeersuppe
Schwemmklöße
Buttermilchkartoffeln
Birnen, Bohnen und Speck

Puddings 
 Sanddorntorte
 Black bread pudding (Schwarzbrotpudding)
 Rote Grütze
 Mandelkringel
 Sour cream pudding (Schmandpudding)
 Arme Ritter
 Mecklenburg Götterspeise (Mecklenburgische Götterspeise)
 Swedish ice cream sundae (Schwedeneisbecher)

Christmas dishes 
Honigkuchen auf dem Blech
White Pfeffernüsse (Weiße Pfeffernüsse)

Drink 

Grog
Mecklenburg country wine (Landwein) from the Stargarder Land
Sanddorn: sanddorn wine, sanddorn spirit, and sanddorn fruit juice

Beers 
 Darguner Pilsener, Dunkelbier, Stierbier, Mecklenburger Pilsener, Schloss Hefeweizen, etc., from the Darguner Brauerei
 Rostocker Pilsener, Bockbier, Dunkelbier, etc., from the Hanseatische Brauerei Rostock
 Lübzer Pils, Bock, Export, Schwarzbier, Urkraft, Nordbräu Pilsner and Duckstein from the Mecklenburgische Brauerei Lübz

Gourmet food 

Several leading restaurants in Mecklenburg have been given awards for excellence this century.

Amongst the starred restaurants listed in the 2015 Michelin Guide are the Ostseelounge im Strandhotel Fischland in Dierhagen, the Gourmet-Restaurant Friedrich Franz in Heiligendamm, the Alte Schule Fürstenhagen in the Feldberg Lake District, the Ich weiß ein Haus am See restaurant in Krakow am See and Der Butt in Rostock.

The 2015 edition of the Gault-Millau culinary guide lists the Gourmet-Restaurant Friedrich Franz, headed by chef Ronny Siewert, in Heiligendamm as their top gourmet restaurant with 18 points out of 20. In second place, each with 16 points are chefs, Daniel Schmidthaler from the Alten Schule Fürstenhagen (Feldberg Lake District), Matthias Stolze from Der Butt restaurant (Rostock-Warnemünde) and Pierre Nippkow of the Ostseelounge (Dierhagen). On 15 points are Alexander Ramm from the Jagdhaus Heiligendamm and Raik Zeigner of Ich weiß ein Haus am See (Krakow am See). Other leading restaurant guides, like the Varta-Führer, the Bertelsmann Guide, Der Feinschmecker and the Schlemmer Atlas assess that gourmet restaurants in Mecklenburg are of high quality.

Literature 
 Frieda Ritzerow: Mecklenburgisches Kochbuch. Fifth edition, Hinstorff, Rostock, 1990 (unabridged replica of the 1868 edition).

See also 
 Pomeranian cuisine

References

External links 

 Cuisine in Mecklenburg-Vorpommern

German cuisine by region
North German cuisine
Cuisine